Patrick Loudon Mollison,  (17 March 1914 – 26 November 2011), was a British haematologist, described as 'the father of transfusion medicine'.

Life
Mollison was born on 17 March 1914, to Beatrice Marjorie, née Walker, and William Mayhew Mollison. His father was an ear, nose and throat surgeon at Guy's Hospital, and his paternal grandfather, William Loudon Mollison, was a Scottish mathematician and Master of Clare College, Cambridge.

He attended St Peter's School, Seaford, followed by Rugby School, then underwent medical training at Clare College and St Thomas' Hospital, qualifying in 1938.

He joined the Royal Army Medical Corps in 1943, during World War II, serving in Germany and visiting the newly-liberated Bergen-Belsen concentration camp. He also visited Burma, by which time he was a lieutenant colonel.

He was Director of the Medical Research Council's Blood Transfusion Research Unit (later the Experimental Haematology Unit), from 1946 to 1979; and Professor of Haematology at St Mary's Hospital, London from 1962 to 1979.

Elizabeth II consulted him on each of her four pregnancies, and he was made a Commander of the Order of the British Empire (CBE) in the 1979 New Year Honours. He was also elected a Fellow of the Royal College of Physicians (FRCP) and a Fellow of the Royal Society (FRS).

He died on 26 November 2011.

Significant works

References

External links 

 

1914 births
Place of birth missing
2011 deaths
Place of death missing
Royal Army Medical Corps officers
Commanders of the Order of the British Empire
Fellows of the Royal College of Physicians
Fellows of the Royal Society
British haematologists
British medical researchers